Guyuk is a town and Local Government Area in Adamawa State, Nigeria. Guyuk has many limestone deposits. Guyuk is located along the Numan–Biu road.

The local ethnic group in Guyuk is the Longuda people. The Longuda Kingdom title is Kwandi Nguryaba. The Nunguraba (Lunguda) people who today inhabit Guyuk Local Government Area of Adamawa State and parts of Gombe State originated from the Middle East. They migrated from there during the general dispersal of races of the world from the area. They moved westward in the direction of sunset with the aim of reaching it. They realized the futility of this exercise when they reached Wanda, a small flat land on the Lunguda Plateau in present day Gombe State. In search of land for agricultural purposes, they migrated to their present day location.

Like many ethnic groups of Nigeria, the Lunguda people had no centrally recognized authority structure before the advent of colonial rule. They lived in small form of clannish loose confederation with each clan having its own head. They were however bounded by one language and tradition. "Nunguraya" as the people call themselves, means interwoven or interconnected. The people are one. As a result of their oneness there existed a form of defense pact among all the various villages. These defense pacts kept the Lunguda people consistently undefeated throughout the era of intertribal warfare.

There was also the acknowledgement of the rain making priest in Lamza. Guyuk, Kurnyi and Wala Lunguda. In 1904 however, the Lunguda nation engaged the white man in a fierce battle in Banjir. This war nearly broke the fighting spirit of the Lunguda Man because of the superiority of the fire-emanating weapons of the white man. In other words, the white man only subdued them. A district council was formed in 1948 under the leadership of Grema Parku, this council was the first nationally accepted rule by the Lunguda man. The council consisted of seven villages: Dukul, Guyuk, Banjiram, Kola, Gwanah, Lokoro and Bobini. It had Mallam Grema Parku as its Chairman. He represented the District in the Numan native authority in that capacity. The year 1948 marked the beginning of the formal coming together of the Lunguda people under some form of central administration in the area.

The idea of having a paramount chief among the Lunguda was giving serious consideration in 1954, when the colonial administration wanted to present 3rd Class staff of office to each of the District Heads in Numan native authority, so as to boast the chieftaincy status of these areas. A referendum was conducted after which the ruling house of Guyuk was on unanimously accepted to produce a candidate.

After a series of meetings by the "Bilamaha" and "Nakatebehe" King makers of the whole Lunguda villages, Mallam Yoila Jarangalu emerged as the popular candidate in 1956.

The Chieftaincy of Lunguda is rotated between two ruling clans "Bongsibe" and "Bwongkubebe" Mallam Yoila who belong to the Bonsibe was installed in 1957. Thus was the first Lunguda Chief to be presented third class staff of office. Today however, the chiefdom has seven district heads and closed to sixty villages.

References
2.   https://web.facebook.com/AdamawaSG/posts/209890080389291

3.   https://web.facebook.com/mypilotnews/photos/pcb.209198023896293/209197957229633/

Local Government Areas in Adamawa State